The Scotland men's national under-16 basketball team is a national basketball team of Scotland, administered by the Basketballscotland. It represents the country in international under-16 basketball competitions.

The team finished 19th at the 1975 FIBA Europe Under-16 Championship. They also won 8 medals at the FIBA U16 European Championship Division C.

See also
Scotland men's national basketball team
Scotland men's national under-18 basketball team
Scotland women's national under-16 basketball team

References

Basketball in Scotland
Men's national under-16 basketball teams
Basketball